Braewick is a settlement on the west Mainland of Shetland, Scotland.

References

External links

Canmore - Braewick site record

Villages in Mainland, Shetland